Mukurweini Constituency is an electoral constituency in Kenya. It is one of six constituencies in Nyeri County. Mukurweini Constituency comprises Mukurweini division of Nyeri County. 
The constituency has seven wards, all electing councillors for the Nyeri County Council. The constituency was established for the 1969 elections.

Members of Parliament

Wards

References 

Constituencies in Nyeri County
Constituencies in Central Province (Kenya)
1969 establishments in Kenya
Constituencies established in 1969